The NKU Chase College of Law (formerly Salmon P. Chase College of Law, also known as Chase College of Law) is the law school of Northern Kentucky University, a public university in Highland Heights, Kentucky. It provides both part-time (day and evening) and full-time programs of study that lead to a Juris Doctor (J.D.) degree, as well as joint degrees in JD/Master of Business Administration, JD/Master of Health Informatics, and JD/Master of Business Informatics. The law school also has a program that leads to a LLM degree in U.S. law that is designed for internationally trained lawyers, and a program that leads to a MLS degree designed for individuals interested in developing a better understanding of the law as it affects their careers involving legal or regulatory issues.

History
The law school was founded in 1893 and accredited by the American Bar Association in 1959. The school was named for U.S. Chief Justice, Salmon P. Chase, who was appointed to the Supreme Court by President Abraham Lincoln in 1864. Prior to his appointment, Chase was one of the most prominent politicians of the mid-19th century, serving as a U.S. senator from Ohio, the governor of Ohio, and the Secretary of the Treasury under Lincoln. He began practicing law in Cincinnati in 1830, and became an advocate for abolition and the anti-slavery movement, lending his skills to the cause of fugitive slaves, often free of charge. He spoke passionately on behalf of African Americans when their status and rights were not recognized and became known as the "attorney general of runaway slaves" for his frequent defense of slaves and those who harbored them. In 2013, members of Chase's family presented the Cincinnati Museum Center with a sterling silver pitcher given to him in 1845 by a group of grateful African Americans.

The Salmon P. Chase College of Law was initially founded as an evening law school affiliated with the Cincinnati YMCA. Classes were held in the YMCA building on Central Parkway in downtown Cincinnati from 1917 to 1972. In 1971, Chase crossed the Ohio River and merged into the Kentucky state university system by becoming a part of Northern Kentucky University (then "Northern Kentucky State College"). During summer 1972, the law school moved from downtown Cincinnati across the Ohio River to NKU's Covington campus. In 1981, Chase moved to its present location on the NKU campus in Highland Heights, remaining within the Cincinnati/Northern Kentucky metropolitan area. In 2006, the college of law was rebranded NKU Chase College of Law. Chase has a student/professor ratio of nine to one.

Moot court
NKU Chase's moot court program was ranked number 22 by the Blakely Advocacy Institute at the University of Houston Law Center for the 2012–2013 academic year. Ranking is based on points awarded for achievement in national moot court competitions. Some of NKU Chase's 2012–13 competition team successes include:
 Scribes Best Brief of the Year Award (chosen from the Wagner Labor & Employment Law competition brief); 
 National Moot Court Competition in Child Welfare & Adoption Law – champion and runner-up, second place brief, and best final-round advocate; 
 South Texas Mock Trial Challenge – octo-finalist; 
 Mugel National Tax Moot Court – semi-finalist, best brief, and second and third place best oralists; 
 Robert F. Wagner Labor & Employment Law Moot Court Competition – quarter-finalist and best brief;
 Regional Transactional LawMeet – second place; 
 ABA Regional Client Counseling Competition – third place; and 
 ABA Regional Arbitration Competition – champion.

Notable alumni
 Joe Cunningham, member of the U.S. House of Representatives from South Carolina's 1st district.
 John H. Druffel, judge, United States District Court for the Southern District of Ohio
 Charles H. Elston, US House of Representative from Ohio
 Michelle M. Keller, justice, Kentucky Supreme Court
 Robert Ruwe U.S. senior judge of the United States Tax Court
 Candace Smith, magistrate judge, United States District Court for the Eastern District of Kentucky

References

 
Chase
Educational institutions established in 1893
1893 establishments in Kentucky
Northern Kentucky University
Universities and colleges founded by the YMCA